This is a list of Television in South Korea related events from 2022.

Ongoing

Animation

New Series & Returning Shows

Drama

Animation

Ending

Drama

References

2022 in South Korean television